Amin Homaei (Persian: امین همایی‎; born July 13, 1984) is an Iranian musician and composer. He is noted for his collaborations with Salar Aghili, the National Symphony Orchestra of Ukraine, among other musical artists and groups.

Early life
After graduating from Farabi High School, Homaei became a railway worker. He started playing music when he was 18 years old. His first instrument was the piano. He worked mainly in his father's factories until 2017, and subsequently became a musical composer.

Career
Homaei recorded and released the album Spring Blossoms on January 3, 2019. He recorded the album in collaboration with the National Symphony Orchestra of Ukraine (Volodymyr Sirenko) and the Kurdo Choir.

Homaei released his second album, Dance on the Moon, with the same orchestra on May 1, 2019. He collaborated with traditional Iranian musician Vahid in the souvenir piece. The composition was released in April 2022.

Homaei's album Before Autumn After Autumn with Omid Nemati was released in November 2020. Other recorded albums of his include Rafteri with Salar Aghili (January 2021), and Ey Sanam with Mohammad Reza Niazi on his poems was recorded in January 2021.

Another one of his albums is Symphony in C Minor.

Homaei has been a participant in the Fajr International Music Festival.

References

Living people
1984 births
21st-century Iranian musicians
Iranian composers